The year 2011 is the 2nd year in the history of Australian Fighting Championship (AFC), a mixed martial arts promotion based in Australia. In 2011 AFC held 2 events.

Events list

AFC 2 
AFC 2 was an event held on September 3, 2011, at Melbourne Sports and Aquatic Centre in Melbourne, Australia.

Results

AFC Fight Night 
AFC Fight Night was an event held on June 25, 2011, at State Netball and Hockey Centre in Melbourne, Australia.

Results

References 

2011 in mixed martial arts
2011 in Australian sport
AFC (mixed martial arts) events